Everything's Relative is an American sitcom starring Jason Alexander, John Bolger, Gina Hecht, Tony Deacon Nittoli and Anne Jackson which aired on CBS from October 3 to November 7, 1987.

Summary
The series centered around the Beeby brothers – Julian (Alexander), a divorced, hard-working 33-year-old businessman and Scott (Bolger), a single 25-year-old womanizing construction worker – who shared a loft apartment in the SoHo section of lower Manhattan despite their different lifestyles, values, careers, and social lives.

Other characters included Emily Cabot (Hecht), Julian's business partner and friend; Mickey Murphy (Nittoli), a young man who ran errands for both brothers; and Rae (Jackson), the boys' meddling and opinionated mother.

Episodes

External links
 

1987 American television series debuts
1987 American television series endings
1980s American sitcoms
English-language television shows
Television shows set in New York City
CBS original programming
Television series about brothers
Television series by Sony Pictures Television